Lithothamnion is a genus of thalloid red alga comprising 103 species. Its members are known by a number of common names. The monomerous, crustose thalli are composed of a single system of filaments which grow close to the underlying surface. Lithothamnion reproduces by means of multiporate conceptacles.

Species 

The  valid species currently considered to belong to this genus are:

L. album
L. antarcticum
L. apiculatum
L. asperulatum
L. aucklandicum
L. australe
L. brasiliense
L. breviaxe
L. calcareum
L. californicum
L. capense
L. carolii
L. chathamense
L. circumscriptum
L. colliculosum
L. corallioides
L. coralloides
L. cottonii
L. coulmanicum
L. crispatum
L. dehiscens
L. diguetii
L. ectocarpon
L. elegans
L. engelhartii
L. esperi
L. expansum
L. flavescens
L. fornicatum
L. fragiissimum
L. fruticulosum
L. fuegianum
L. geppiorum
L. gibbosum
L. giganteum
L. glaciale
L. grade
L. grande
L. granuliferum
L. guadalupense
L. hamelii
L. haptericola
L. hauckii
L. heterocladum
L. heteromorphum
L. incrustans
L. indicum
L. insigne
L. intermedium
L. islei
L. japonicum
L. kerguelenum
L. labradorense
L. lacroixi
L. laminosum
L. lemoineae
L. magnum
L. maldivicum
L. mangini
L. margaritae
L. marlothii
L. minervae
L. montereyicum
L. muelleri
L. murmanicum
L. neglectum
L. nitidum
L. nodulosum
L. norvegicum
L. notarisii
L. novae-zelandiae
L. occidentale
L. pacificum
L. pauciporosum
L. peleense
L. peruviense
L. philippii
L. phymatodeum
L. pocillum
L. polymorphum
L. praefruticulosum
L. proliferum
L. propontidis
L. rugosum
L. ruptile
L. scabiosum
L. sejunctum
L. sonderi
L. soriferum
L. spissum
L. squarrulosum
L. tenue
L. thelostegium
L. tophiforme
L. tusterense
L. ungeri
L. valens
L. validum
L. van
L. vanheurckii
L. vescum
L. volcanum

Uses 

The species Lithothamnium calcareum is, besides Tricalcium phosphate, often used as food fortification in plant-based milk substitutes to achieve a similar calcium content as a cow milk which is around 120 mg/100 ml.  However, in April 2021 the European Court of Justice forbade its use in organic food products such as drinks.

Notes

References

External links 
Images of Lithothamnion at Algaebase

Corallinaceae